Chain Lakes are a set of small freshwater lakes located on a gulley on the south skirt of La Bohn Peak, in the far east border of King County, Washington. Chain Lakes is surrounded by prominent peaks and lakes at the heart of the Alpine Lakes Wilderness.

Mining
Chain Lakes is located in an area of rugged cirques and sharp ridges where mining has been occurring since 1896. The mine has been called Dutch Miller mine where prospecting has been on sulfide minerals and high grade copper deposits found in quartz-tourmaline shoots in the granodiorite rock.

See also 
 List of lakes of the Alpine Lakes Wilderness

References 

Lakes of King County, Washington
Lakes of the Alpine Lakes Wilderness
Okanogan National Forest